The Pittsburgh Steelers Legends team represents the franchise's best players from the pre-1970 era. The club also presented an updated and expanded All-Time team at the same time, which was determined on the basis of fan voting.

While the All-Time team represented the top 33 players in the team's first 75 years, club officials recognized that the All-Time team was selected by fans who had a natural bias toward choosing more recent players due to the team's poor record prior to 1970, and the fact that many Steelers fans would never have seen the older players perform.

As such, many noteworthy players from the team's first four decades were overlooked. The Legends team was created to address this oversight, with Steelers Chairman Dan Rooney saying "There were a lot of great Steelers prior to 1970 who were as good as today's superstars, but fewer people got to see them play.  We are looking forward to welcoming the Legends Team and having today's fans see some of the great Steelers from the pre-1970 era."

The eight-person selection committee that named the Legends team included Dan Rooney, Steelers Vice President Art Rooney Jr., team scout Bill Nunn, former long-time coach Dick Hoak, long-time Steelers broadcaster Myron Cope, former sports editor of the Pittsburgh Press Roy McHugh, and former team officials Joe Gordon and Ed Kiely. This panel chose the top 24 players in the club's pre-1970 history: eleven on offense, eleven on defense, one punter, and one placekicker.

Offense

Defense

Specialists

Notes
Names in bold indicate the player spent his entire playing career with the Steelers.
Finalist in 1970 & 1977

References

Pittsburgh Steelers